{{DISPLAYTITLE:N-Propyl-L-arginine}}

{{chembox
| Verifiedfields = changed
| Watchedfields = changed
| verifiedrevid = 424750638
| Name = N-Propyl--arginine
| ImageFile = N-Propyl-L-arginine.png
| ImageFile_Ref = 
| ImageName = Stereo, skeletal formula of N-propyl-L-arginine (S)
| OtherNames = 2-Amino-5-[(N-propylcarbamimidoyl)amino]pentanoic acid
|Section1=
|Section2=
|Section3=
}}N''-Propyl--arginine''', or more properly NG-propyl--arginine (NPA), is a selective inhibitor of neuronal nitric oxide synthase (nNOS).

Amino acids
Guanidines